USS Mobile (LCS-26) is an  of the United States Navy. Named for the city of Mobile, Alabama, she is the fifth ship to carry the name.

Design
In 2002, the United States Navy initiated a program to develop the first of a fleet of littoral combat ships. The Navy initially ordered two trimaran hulled ships from General Dynamics, which became known as the  after the first ship of the class, . Even-numbered US Navy littoral combat ships are built using the Independence-class trimaran design, while odd-numbered ships are based on a competing design, the conventional monohull . The initial order of littoral combat ships involved a total of four ships, including two of the Independence-class design. On 29 December 2010, the Navy announced that it was awarding Austal USA a contract to build ten additional Independence-class littoral combat ships.

Construction and career 
Mobile was built in her namesake city by Austal USA. The Navy accepted delivery of Mobile on 9 December 2020, during a ceremony held at the Austal USA shipyards. Mobile was commissioned on 22 May 2021.

References

External links

 

Independence-class littoral combat ships
2020 ships